Avonwick railway station is a closed railway station situated in the village of Avonwick in Devon, England. It was the first station on the Kingsbridge branch line.

History
The station opened on the 19 December 1893 when the Great Western Railway(GWR) opened the Kingsbridge branch line. The line had been planned, and authorised in 1882, by the Kingsbridge and Salcombe Railway which was subsequently acquired by the GWR in 1888.

The station was host to a GWR camp coach from 1934 to 1939. A camping coach was also positioned here by the Western Region from 1952 to 1954.

The station closed on 16 September 1963.

The station is now a home with the platform canopy adapted as a conservatory.

References

Bibliography

Further reading

External links
 Avonwick station on navigable 1947 O. S. map

Disused railway stations in Devon
Railway stations in Great Britain opened in 1893
Railway stations in Great Britain closed in 1963
Former Great Western Railway stations